Stankoprom is a Russian designer and manufacturer of machine tools based in Moscow. It was established in 2013 as part as Russia's Import substitution strategy to reduce the country's reliance on foreign-made machine tools. It includes scientific centers as well as manufacturing plants.

Stankoprom is part of the state-owned holding company Rostec, and it incorporates 14 machine tool manufacturers.

Structure
Structure of the company:

Scientific Centers
 Vniialmaz
 Vniiautogenmash
 Vniti Em
 Vniiinstrument
 Mikron
 Ulyanovsky Niat

Machine Manufacturing
 Savelovo Machine Building Plant
 Neftehimautomatika
 Remos-PM

Tools Manufacturing
 Instrumental Plant-PM

Trade and Engineering
 Foreign Trade Enterprise Stankoimport (Llc)
 Foreign Trade Enterprise Stankoimport (Ojsc)
 RT-Stankoinstrument

References

External links
 Official website

Rostec
Manufacturing companies established in 2013
Industrial machine manufacturers
Russian brands